The list of achievements, records and trophies won by the football department of Fenerbahçe.

Honours and achievements

National Championships - 28 (record)
 Turkish Super League
 Winners (19): 1959, 1960–61, 1963–64, 1964–65, 1967–68, 1969–70, 1973–74, 1974–75, 1977–78, 1982–83, 1984–85, 1988–89, 1995–96, 2000–01, 2003–04, 2004–05, 2006–07, 2010–11, 2013–14
 Runners-up (22): 1959–60, 1961–62, 1966–67, 1970–71, 1972–73, 1975–76, 1976–77, 1979–80, 1983–84, 1989–90, 1991–92, 1993–94, 1997–98, 2001–02, 2005–06, 2007–08, 2009–10, 2011–12, 2012–13, 2014–15, 2015–16, 2017–18

 Turkish National Division
 Winners (6) (record): 1937, 1940, 1943, 1945, 1946, 1950
 Runners-up (2): 1944, 1947

 Turkish Football Championship
 Winners (3) (record): 1933, 1935, 1944
 Runners-up (2): 1940, 1947

National Cups - 25
 Turkish Cup
 Winners (6): 1967–68, 1973–74, 1978–79, 1982–83, 2011–12, 2012–13
 Runners-up (11): 1962–63, 1964–65, 1988–89, 1995–96, 2000–01, 2004–05, 2005–06, 2008–09, 2009–10, 2015–16, 2017–18

 Turkish Super Cup
 Winners (9): 1968, 1973, 1975, 1984, 1985, 1990, 2007, 2009, 2014
 Runners-up (9): 1970, 1974, 1978, 1979, 1983, 1989, 1996, 2012, 2013

 Prime Minister's Cup
 Winners (8) (record): 1945, 1946, 1950, 1973, 1980, 1989, 1993, 1998
 Runners-up (7): 1944, 1971, 1976, 1977, 1992, 1994, 1995

 Atatürk Cup 
 Winners (1) (shared-record): 1998

 Spor Toto Cup
 Winners (1): 1967

European competitions
 UEFA Champions League
 Quarter-finals (1): 2007–08

 UEFA Europa League
 Semi-finals (1): 2012–13

 UEFA Europa Conference League
 Last 32 (1): 2021–22

 UEFA Cup Winners' Cup
 Quarter-finals (1): 1963–64

 Balkans Cup
 Winners (1): 1966–67

Regional competitions - 21 (record)
 Istanbul Football League 
 Winners (16) (record): 1911–12, 1913–14, 1914–15, 1920–21, 1922–23, 1929–30, 1932–33, 1934–35, 1935–36, 1936–37, 1943–44, 1946–47, 1947–48, 1952–53, 1956–57, 1958–59

 Istanbul Football Cup
 Winners (1): 1945

 Istanbul Shield 
 Winners (4) (record): 1930, 1934, 1938, 1939

Others
 General Harrington Cup
 Winners (1): 1923

 Atatürk Cup 
 Winners (1) (shared-record): 1964

 Fleet Cup
 Winners (4) (record): 1982, 1983, 1984, 1985

 TSYD Cup
 Winners (12) (shared-record): 1969, 1973, 1975, 1976, 1978, 1979, 1980, 1982, 1985, 1986, 1994, 1995

 TSYD Challenge Cup 
 Winners (2) (record): 1976, 1980

References

Notes

Honors
Honors